The Odd Fellows Rest Cemetery is located in New Orleans, Louisiana. Opened in 1849, Odd Fellow Rest Cemetery is one of a group of historic cemeteries in New Orleans. The cemetery features Renaissance architecture and Exotic Revival architecture. It was listed on the National Register of Historic Places in May 1980. Odd Fellows Rest Cemetery is not open to the public.

History 
Odd Fellows Rest Cemetery is the oldest Fraternal Cemetery in New Orleans. Land for the Odd Fellows Rest Cemetery was purchased for $700 in 1847 by the members of the Grand Lodge of the Independent Order of Odd Fellows. The cemetery was officially opened in 1849 as a burial place for members of the Odd Fellows and their families.  The first interments in the cemetery took place at the opening ceremony in 1849, where the remains of 16 members of the Odd Fellows were disinterred from other cemeteries and reinterred at Odd Fellows. Due to the 1853 Yellow Fever Pandemic burials were opened persons outside the Order of the Odd Fellows.  

Today the cemetery is closed to the public to prevent vandalism. The Herb Import Company shares the cemetery's address and leases the location from the Odd Fellows.

See also
 Independent Order of Odd Fellows
 National Register of Historic Places listings in Orleans Parish, Louisiana

References

External links

 
 
 Odd Fellows Rest
 Renovation work at Odd Fellows Rest Cemetery coincides with RTA streetcar project
 The Herb Import Company | 5055 Canal St.

Cemeteries on the National Register of Historic Places in Louisiana
Renaissance Revival architecture in Louisiana
1849 establishments in Louisiana
Buildings and structures in New Orleans
Odd Fellows cemeteries in the United States
Odd Fellows buildings in Louisiana
National Register of Historic Places in New Orleans